The 2013–14 film awards season began in November 2013 with the Gotham Independent Film Awards 2013 and ended in March 2014 with the 86th Academy Awards. Major winners for the year included 12 Years a Slave, Gravity, Dallas Buyers Club, American Hustle, Blue Jasmine, and Her, among others.

Award ceremonies

Films by awards gained

References 

American film awards